Edward Allen Harris (born November 28, 1950) is an American actor and filmmaker. His performances in Apollo 13 (1995), The Truman Show (1998), Pollock (2000), and The Hours (2002) earned him critical acclaim and Academy Award nominations.

Harris has appeared in several leading and supporting roles, including in The Right Stuff (1983), The Abyss (1989), State of Grace (1990), Glengarry Glen Ross (1992), The Firm (1993), Nixon (1995), The Rock (1996), Stepmom (1998), A Beautiful Mind (2001), Enemy at the Gates (2001), A History of Violence (2005), Gone Baby Gone (2007), National Treasure: Book of Secrets (2007), Snowpiercer (2013), Mother! (2017), The Lost Daughter (2021), and Top Gun: Maverick (2022). In addition to directing Pollock, Harris also directed the Western film Appaloosa (2008).

In television, Harris is notable for his roles as Miles Roby in the miniseries Empire Falls (2005) and as United States Senator John McCain in the television movie Game Change (2012); the latter earning him the Golden Globe Award for Best Supporting Actor – Series, Miniseries or Television Film. He starred as the Man in Black in the HBO science fiction-Western series Westworld (2016–2022), for which he earned a nomination for the Primetime Emmy Award for Outstanding Lead Actor in a Drama Series.

Early life
Harris was born at Englewood Hospital in Englewood, New Jersey, and was raised in the New York City suburb of Tenafly, New Jersey, the son of Margaret (née Sholl), a travel agent, and Robert L. "Bob" Harris (1922–2014), who sang with the Fred Waring chorus and worked at the bookstore of the Art Institute of Chicago. He has an older brother, Robert and a younger brother, Paul. Harris was raised in a middle-class Presbyterian family. His parents were from Oklahoma. He graduated from Tenafly High School in 1969, where he had played on the football team and served as the team's captain in his senior year.

A star athlete in high school, Harris played varsity football at Columbia University and was a teammate of future United States Attorney General Eric Holder. At Columbia, where he said he succumbed to the "Morningside Heights blues" after two years, he was a resident in Carman Hall. When his family moved to New Mexico two years later, Harris followed, having discovered his interest in acting in various theater plays. He enrolled at the University of Oklahoma to study drama. After several successful roles in local theaters (such as the Jewel Box Theater in Oklahoma City), he moved to Los Angeles and enrolled at the California Institute of the Arts, where he spent two years and graduated with a Bachelor of Fine Arts in 1975.

Career

Early plays 

Harris began his career on the stage. In 1976, he played an FBI agent in the world premiere of Thomas Rickman's play Baalam at the Pasadena Repertory Theatre located at the historic The Hotel Carver. He followed that at the Pasadena Repertory Theatre in 1976 playing Lot in the West Coast premiere of Tennessee Williams's play Kingdom of Earth (aka The Seven Descents of Myrtle). Harris's first film role came in 1978 with a minor part in the suspense film Coma, starring Michael Douglas. His first major role in a film came two years later with Borderline (1980), in which he starred alongside Charles Bronson. In 1981, Harris played the lead, William "Billy" Davis, a king of a motorcycle riding renaissance-fair troupe (a role modeled after King Arthur), in Knightriders, directed by George A. Romero. The following year, he has a small role as Hank Blaine in Creepshow, also directed by Romero.

Television roles 

From the mid-1970s to the mid-1980s, Harris found steady work on television. He had a role in one episode of Gibbsville (1975), in one episode of Delvecchio (1977), in one episode of The Rockford Files (1978), in one episode of David Cassidy: Man Undercover (1978), two episodes of The Seekers (1979), one episode of Barnaby Jones (1979), one episode of Paris (1980), three episodes of Lou Grant (1979, 1980, and 1981), one episode of CHiPs (1981), one episode of Hart to Hart (1981), one episode of Cassie & Co. (1981), and one episode of American Playhouse (1984).

1980s 

In 1983, Harris became well known after portraying astronaut John Glenn in The Right Stuff. In 1984, he co starred in the Robert Benton directed drama film Places in the Heart; during production of this film, Harris met and married his wife Amy Madigan.

Also in 1984 he co-starred along with Goldie Hawn and Kurt Russell in the Jonathan Demme directed World War II biopic Swing Shift and in 1985 played abusive husband Charlie Dick to Jessica Lange's Patsy Cline in the HBO film Sweet Dreams. In 1986, he received a Tony Award nomination in the Best Actor in a Play category for his role in George Furth's Precious Sons. He also won the Theatre World Award and Drama Desk Award for Outstanding Actor in a Play for his performance. Harris then portrayed William Walker, a 19th-century American who appointed himself President of Nicaragua, in Walker (1987). That same year, he played Harry Nash in the HBO television thriller film The Last Innocent Man.

In 1988, he acted in Agnieszka Holland's To Kill a Priest, starring Christopher Lambert, based on Jerzy Popiełuszko and his murder under the Polish communist regime. It was well received by critics. In 1989, his role as David "Dave" Flannigan in Jacknife earned him his first Golden Globe Award nomination, for Best Supporting Actor – Motion Picture. Also in 1989, he portrayed Virgil "Bud" Brigman in the sci fi film The Abyss, directed by James Cameron.

1990s 
In 1992, Harris co starred as Dave Moss in the drama film Glengarry Glen Ross, based on the play of the same name by David Mamet. He won the Valladolid International Film Festival Award for Best Actor for his performance in the film. He next appeared in the films The Firm (1993) and Needful Things (1993), before portraying the lead role of Kyle Bodine in the neo noir film China Moon (1994).

In 1995, Harris portrayed Watergate figure E. Howard Hunt in the Oliver Stone biopic Nixon, and received his first Academy Award for Best Supporting Actor nomination for his performance as NASA Apollo Mission Control Director Gene Kranz in Apollo 13. In 1996, Harris starred in and executive produced the television adaptation of Riders of the Purple Sage. That same year, he returned to Broadway as Major Steve Arnold in the Ronald Harwood play Taking Sides. In 1998, his co starring role in The Truman Show earned him a second nomination for the Academy Award for Best Supporting Actor, and a Golden Globe Award for Best Supporting Actor – Motion Picture win.

2000s 
Harris made his directorial debut in 2000 with the drama biopic Pollock, in which he also starred as artist Jackson Pollock. He was nominated for his first Academy Award for Best Actor (and third Oscar overall) for his performance. To prepare for the role, he built a small studio in which to copy the painter's techniques. Two years later, Harris was nominated for his fourth Academy Award (third in the Best Supporting Actor category) for his role as Richard Brown in the British American drama film The Hours.

In between the two Oscar nominated roles, he appeared in the biographical drama A Beautiful Mind (2001) and portrayed German sniper Major Erwin König in the war thriller Enemy at the Gates (2001). From June to July 2002, he starred in adverts for the Vauxhall Vectra in the United Kingdom.

For his lead role as Miles Roby in the 2005 miniseries Empire Falls, Harris was nominated for the Primetime Emmy Award for Outstanding Lead Actor in a Miniseries or a Movie and the Golden Globe Award for Best Actor – Miniseries or Television Film. Also that year, he played a vengeful mobster in David Cronenberg's A History of Violence (2005) starring Viggo Mortensen. In 2006, he portrayed composer Ludwig van Beethoven in the film Copying Beethoven, and starred in the television documentary film The Armenian Genocide as American diplomat Leslie Davis. He next appeared alongside Casey Affleck and Morgan Freeman in the Ben Affleck directed neo noir mystery film Gone Baby Gone (2007). Harris then co-starred as the antagonist Mitch Wilkinson in National Treasure: Book of Secrets (2007), alongside Nicolas Cage.

In 2008, he co wrote, directed and starred along with Viggo Mortensen in the western Appaloosa. In 2010, he and wife Amy Madigan appeared together in Ash Adams' independent crime drama Once Fallen. Later that same year, Harris starred in the survival drama The Way Back as Mr. Smith. His performance received much critical praise, and he was suggested by critics to receive a fifth Oscar nomination.

2010s 
In 2010, he portrayed the role of Jason Hudson in Call of Duty: Black Ops. In 2012, he co-starred alongside Sam Worthington in the thriller film Man on a Ledge for Summit Entertainment. He then won the Golden Globe Award for Best Supporting Actor – Series, Miniseries or Television Film and was nominated for the Primetime Emmy Award for Outstanding Supporting Actor in a Miniseries or a Movie for his performance as Senator John McCain in the HBO made for television drama Game Change.

In 2013, he appeared in the western thriller Sweetwater, and starred opposite Annette Bening in the romantic drama film The Face of Love. Harris then voiced Mission Control in Alfonso Cuarón's space epic Gravity (2013), starring Sandra Bullock and George Clooney.

In 2015, he portrayed the title character in the film version of the Shakespeare tragedy Cymbeline. In 2016, he appeared alongside Madigan and Taissa Farmiga in The New Group's revival of Sam Shepard's Buried Child, for which he was nominated for the Lucille Lortel Award for Outstanding Lead Actor in a Play.

In 2016, he also began playing the villainous Man in Black in HBO's sci-fi thriller series Westworld, and had a co-starring role in the ensemble cast of Warren Beatty's romantic comedy drama Rules Don't Apply, with Lily Collins and Alden Ehrenreich. In 2017, he appeared in Dean Devlin's sci-fi film Geostorm, alongside Gerard Butler and Andy García. Harris had been previously set to star in Alejandro González Iñárritu's Starz drama series The One Percent with Hilary Swank and Ed Helms.

Harris co-starred in Darren Aronofsky's horror film Mother! (2017), alongside Jennifer Lawrence, Javier Bardem, Michelle Pfeiffer, and Domhnall Gleeson. Harris also starred in the 2017 movie Kodachrome. His performance was widely regarded as one of the film's highlights.

On November 5, 2019, Harris took over the role of Atticus Finch in Aaron Sorkin's stage adaptation of To Kill a Mockingbird on Broadway. The role was previously played by original cast member Jeff Daniels.

Personal life
Harris married actress Amy Madigan on November 21, 1983, while they were filming Places in the Heart together. They have one daughter, Lily Dolores Harris (born May 3, 1993).

On March 21, 1999, during the 71st Academy Awards, Harris along with Amy Madigan openly showed disdain for Elia Kazan, who had received an Academy Honorary Award, by staying in their seats and not applauding. This was due to Kazan's testimony before the House Un-American Activities Committee in 1952, naming his friends from the Group Theatre as communists resulting in their being blacklisted; for which Kazan had never given an apology.

On March 20, 2012, the Screen Actors Guild (SAG) and the American Federation of Television and Radio Artists (AFTRA) merged to form a new union, SAG-AFTRA. Harris, along with others including Edward Asner, Martin Sheen, Valerie Harper, Michael Bell, and Wendy Schaal, were opposed to the merger and sued SAG President Ken Howard and several SAG Vice Presidents, seeking to have the merger undone. They were unsuccessful. The lawsuit was dismissed on May 22, 2012.

Harris has a reputation for being serious on the film set. He told a journalist in 2006, "I don't like bullshittin' ... so, I guess that comes across as serious." On March 13, 2015, he was honored with a star on the Hollywood Walk of Fame, located at 6712 Hollywood Boulevard, for his work in motion pictures. Harris received an honorary degree from Muhlenberg College on May 17, 2015.

New York magazine once described Harris as "the thinking woman's sex symbol".

Filmography

Awards and nominations

Harris has received numerous accolades including two Screen Actors Guild Awards and two Golden Globe Awards. He has also received nominations for four Academy Awards, two BAFTA Awards, three Primetime Emmy Awards and a Tony Award.

Harris has been recognized by the Academy of Motion Picture Arts and Sciences for the following performances:
 68th Academy Awards: Best Actor in a Supporting Role, nomination, for Apollo 13 (1995)
 71st Academy Awards: Best Actor in a Supporting Role, nomination, for The Truman Show (1998)
 73rd Academy Awards: Best Actor in a Leading Role, nomination, for Pollock (2000)
 75th Academy Awards: Best Actor in a Supporting Role, nomination, for The Hours (2002)

References

External links

 
 
 
 

1950 births
20th-century American male actors
21st-century American male actors
American male film actors
American male screenwriters
American male stage actors
American male television actors
American male voice actors
American Presbyterians
Best Supporting Actor Golden Globe (film) winners
Best Supporting Actor Golden Globe (television) winners
California Institute of the Arts alumni
Columbia Lions football players
Drama Desk Award winners
Film directors from New Jersey
Film producers from New Jersey
Living people
Method actors
Male actors from New Jersey
Obie Award recipients
Outstanding Performance by a Cast in a Motion Picture Screen Actors Guild Award winners
Outstanding Performance by a Male Actor in a Supporting Role Screen Actors Guild Award winners
People from Tenafly, New Jersey
Screenwriters from New Jersey
Tenafly High School alumni
Theatre World Award winners
University of Oklahoma alumni
Columbia College (New York) alumni